Mayte Gómez Macanás (7 March 1984 Murcia, Spain), who performs under the name  Mayte,  is a Spanish singer and was 11th placed finalist on the fifth series of reality television show Operación Triunfo.

Early life 
During her childhood she played the piano and around the age of 16, she began to sing professionally. She studied piano about two years in an academy, has sung in orchestras and also recorded several demo tapes. She also won several galas in her native city, Murcia. At 20 years old, she studied Tourism.

Operación Triunfo 2006 
After several previous attempts, At 22 she tried out for Operación Triunfo in the summer of 2006 and was selected from over 23,000 aspirants.

During her stay in Operación Triunfo, she sang a total of eight songs live, recorded various studio covers, and also composed with fellow contestants, Mercedes Durán and Moritz Antón, a song entitled "Dos Mares" ("Two Seas"), which became the theme song for the  “Operación Triunfo 2006: Adelante” soundtrack. In this album she also did a duet with fellow contestant, Jorge González, with the song "Volver a sentir" (“To return to feel”). In addition to other participations in the disc. She surpassed two nominations of the jury to leave the academy. The third time she was nominated was her last as she didn't obtain enough votes from the public and was eliminated. On 26 November 2006 Mayte left the show between diverse controversies due to the supposed injustice of her nominations.

Post O.T. 
After she left the program she embarked on a national tour all over Spain with her fellow Operacion Triunfo finalists.

In 2008, Mayte tried out for the Eurovision Song Contest with her debut single entitled - Even though she was a favorite, she did not obtain enough votes to make it through to the Spanish preselection national finals. Mayte has recently been working on her highly anticipated debut album. The album is set to have an urban/R&B feel in the vein of Craig David and Mary J. Blige. The record will be released sometime in 2009. Some song clips can currently be heard on her Myspace page

Artistic experience/concourses and awards 
 Soloist singer in magazine of varieties, year 2003, Murcia
 Principal singer in the orchestra “Royal Music”, Murcia, season 2003-2004
 Singer in duet with Salvador Pérez Ortega, "Dúo Macaró", from 2004 to 2006
 Participant like invited artist in diverse programs of playful character of television and radio of the Region of Murcia
 Participation in an announcement for “Perfumerias If”, of national diffusion
 Participant in a campaign of “Global Humanitaria”, for national television
 2003—2nd Award "Archena busca una estrella" ("Archena is looking for a star"), Murcia
 2003—3rd Award "Embrujo de canciones" ("Songs charming"), Murcia
 2004—2nd Award "Estrellas de Murcia" ("Stars from Murcia"), Murcia
 2005—3rd Award "Archena busca una estrella" ("Archena is looking for a star"), duet with Salvador Pérez Ortega
 2005—1st Award "Estrellas de Murcia" ("Stars from Murcia"), duet with Salvador Salvador Pérez Ortega
 2006—Participant of "Operación Triunfo", Telecinco

Discography

References

External links
Official MySpace
Official fansite

1984 births
Living people
Star Academy participants
People from Murcia
Singers from the Region of Murcia
Macanas, Mayte
21st-century Spanish singers
21st-century Spanish women singers